Zaporizhian March is an expressive Ukrainian folk musical art that was preserved and revived by bandurist Yevhen Adamtsevych. The march became more famous after its arrangement by  who merged the march with the folk song about Doroshenko and Sahaidachny.

Authenticity 
It is widely accepted that the author of the famous «Zaporizhia march» alone is the Romny kobzar Yevhen Adamtsevych, a student of Musiy Oleksiyenko. In particular, it is confirmed via the correspondence of the researcher of kobzar performance O.Pravdyuk with the bandurist. In one letter to him Yevhen Adamtsevych wrote:

In addition the Yevhen Adamtsevych first performed it in public - to the general public march became known in 1969 thanks to the performance of the blind bandurist. Subsequently, the march for orchestra was arranged by the chief conductor of the State Orchestra of National Instruments, Viktor Hutsal. The main theme of the composition consists of syncopation and descending melodies which in the technique national bandurists played with fingers sliding on the strings that was first used by a bandura player Hnat Khotkevych in instrumental accompaniment for his composition of folk song about Baida («Poem of Baida», 1912), which he orchestrated in 1930.

Hypotheses regarding the origin of the work 
 According to some assumptions, this work has been in the repertoire of teachers of Yevhen Adamtsevych , a respected expert on creativity and heritage of the artist's performance believed that this march was co-authored with Musiy Oleksiyenko, and that the learning student picked up the first part of march from his teacher and further continued the melody creation. This, in particular, is according to the memoirs of M.Oleksiyenko children.
 Also, some sources mention Prokop Mormilya, a native talent from the village Yaduty, Borzna Raion, Chernihiv Oblast whom Yevhen Adamtsevych visited.

History 
At first Yevhen Adamtsevych performed the march publicly in 1969 at a concert in the Kyiv Opera Theater of Taras Shevchenko.

Eyewitnesses described the concert so:

On April 12, 1970 the orchestra performed the remake of the march at first. The artistic director and conductor  repeated the piece ou bis several times. Thus until 1974 the «Zaporozhian March» was performed at all concerts several times. The public always welcomed musicians standing. The composition became more famous after it was included in the soundtrack of the Borys Ivchenko film «Propala Hramota» (Vanished Document) in 1972. After performing the march at the Bolshoi Theatre (Moscow), it became an interest of party leaders who worried about a very heightened spiritual atmosphere among the audience. Communists have carefully studied the notes checking them with songs of Sich Riflemen. Although nothing was found, the march  was banned. While V.Hutsal had to resign and join another group.

Performance 
 Since 1984 the Zaporizhian March was allowed to be performed. It became to sound at rallies during the struggle for independence in the late 1980s. The sounds of the march assemble deputies in the Verkhovna Rada.
 Under S.Tvorun arrangement it is also one of the main marches of the Armed Forces of Ukraine named «Cossack march». In ZSU after 1991 this march replaced «Farewell of Slavianka» on recruitment days and open houses.
 «Zaporozhian March» entered the repertoire of the National Orchestra of National Instruments.

See also 
 Prayer for Ukraine

Further reading
 Dibrova, H. Romny kobzar Musiy Oleksiyenko. "National art and ethnography". 1991.

References

External links
The Godfather of the Zaporizhian March
March of the Zaporozhian Cossacks. "With Fire and Sword". YouTube.
"Zaporozhian March"/"Запорозький марш". Orchestra. YouTube.
"Hey, on the hilltop those reapers reap" by the State Merited Capella of Bandurists of Ukraine. YouTube.

March music
Ukrainian patriotic songs
1969 songs